Friedrich-Ebert-Halle (also known as Eberthalle) is an indoor arena located in Ludwigshafen, Germany, which can accommodate 2,250 guests. The facility was designed by Roland Rainer and completed in 1965. It is used for sporting events, fairs, exhibitions and concerts. Past performers include The Kinks, The Who, Dio, Rainbow and Whitesnake.

References

Indoor arenas in Germany
Buildings and structures in Rhineland-Palatinate
Sport in Ludwigshafen
Sports venues in Rhineland-Palatinate